Frederic Geeson (23 August 1862 – 2 May 1920) was an English cricketer active from 1892 to 1913 who played for Leicestershire. He was born in Redmile and died in Johannesburg. He appeared in 151 first-class matches as a righthanded batsman who bowled right arm medium pace and leg spin. He scored 3,694 runs with a highest score of 104* and took 472 wickets with a best performance of eight for 110.

Notes

1862 births
1920 deaths
English cricketers
Leicestershire cricketers
Marylebone Cricket Club cricketers
Lincolnshire cricketers